Klaudia Maliszewska (born 28 January 1992) is a Polish Paralympic athlete who competes in the shot put at international elite competitions. She is a World bronze medalist and a European silver medalist and she is selected to compete at the 2020 Summer Paralympics. She is the daughter of Polish Paralympic powerlifter Miroslaw Maliszewski.

References

1992 births
Living people
People from Grudziądz
Paralympic athletes of Poland
Polish female shot putters
Athletes (track and field) at the 2020 Summer Paralympics
Medalists at the World Para Athletics Championships
Medalists at the World Para Athletics European Championships